Preemption is an unincorporated community and census-designated place in Preemption Township, Mercer County, Illinois, United States. As of the 2020 census, it had a population of 254.

Roy James Carver (1909-1981), American philanthropist and businessman, was born in Preemption.

Demographics

References

Census-designated places in Mercer County, Illinois
Census-designated places in Illinois
Unincorporated communities in Mercer County, Illinois
Unincorporated communities in Illinois